In organic chemistry, alkynylation is an addition reaction in which a terminal alkyne is added to a carbonyl group to form an α-alkynyl alcohol. 

When the acetylide is formed from acetylene, the reaction gives an α-ethynyl alcohol. This process is often referred to as ethynylation.  Such processes often involve metal  acetylide intermediates.

Scope
The principal reaction of interest involves the addition of the acetylene to a ketone  or aldehyde:
RR'C=O + HC#CR'' -> RR'C(OH)C#CR''
The reaction proceeds with retention of the triple bond.  For aldehydes and unsymmetrical ketones, the product is chiral, hence there is interest in asymmetric variants.  These reactions invariably involve metal-acetylide intermediates.

This reaction was discovered by chemist John Ulric Nef in 1899 while experimenting with reactions of elemental sodium, phenylacetylene, and acetophenone. For this reason, the reaction is sometimes referred to as Nef synthesis. Sometimes this reaction is erroneously called the Nef reaction, a name more often used to describe a different reaction (see Nef reaction). Chemist Walter Reppe coined the term ethynylation during his work with acetylene and carbonyl compounds.

In the following reaction (scheme 1), the alkyne proton of ethyl propiolate is deprotonated by n-butyllithium at -78 °C to form lithium ethyl propiolate to which cyclopentanone is added forming a lithium alkoxide. Acetic acid is added to remove lithium and liberate the free alcohol.

Modifications
Several modifications of alkynylation reactions are known:
 In the Arens–van Dorp synthesis the compound ethoxyacetylene is converted to a Grignard reagent and reacted with a ketone, the reaction product is a propargyl alcohol.
 The Isler modification is a modification of Arens–Van Dorp Synthesis where ethoxyacetylene is replaced by β-chlorovinyl ether and lithium amide.

Catalytic variants
Alkynylations, including the asymmetric variety, have been developed as metal-catalyzed reactions. Various catalytic additions of alkynes to electrophiles in water have also been developed.

Uses
Alkynylation finds use in synthesis of pharmaceuticals, particularly in the preparation of steroid hormones. For example, ethynylation of 17-ketosteroids produces important contraceptive medications known as progestins. Examples include drugs such as Norethisterone, Ethisterone, and Lynestrenol. Hydrogenation of these compounds produces anabolic steroids with oral bioavailability, such as Norethandrolone.

Alkynylation is used to prepare commodity chemicals such as propargyl alcohol, butynediol, 2-methylbut-3-yn-2-ol (a precursor to isoprenes such as vitamin A), 3-hexyne-2,5-diol (a precursor to Furaneol), and sulcatone (a precursor to Linalool).

Reaction conditions
For the stoichiometric reactions involving alkali metal or alkaline earth acetylides, work-up for the reaction requires liberation of the alcohol.  To achieve this hydrolysis, aqueous acids are often employed.
 RR'C(ONa)C#CR''{} + \overset{acetic\, acid}{CH3COOH} -> RR'C(OH)C#CR''{} + \overset{sodium\, acetate}{CH3COONa}

Common solvents for the reaction include  ethers, acetals, dimethylformamide, and dimethyl sulfoxide.

Variations

Grignard reagents
Grignard reagents of acetylene or alkynes can be used to perform alkynylations on compounds that are liable to polymerization reactions via enolate intermediates. However, substituting lithium for sodium or potassium acetylides accomplishes similar results, often giving this route little advantage over the conventional reaction.

Favorskii reaction
The Favorskii reaction is an alternative set of reaction conditions, which involves prereaction of the acetylene with an alkali metal hydroxide such as KOH. The reaction proceeds through equilibria, making the reaction reversible:

 HC#CH + KOH <=> HC#CK + H2O
 RR'C=O + HC#CK <=> RR'C(OK)C#CH

To overcome this reversibility, the reaction often uses an excess of base to trap the water as hydrates.

Reppe chemistry
Chemist Walter Reppe pioneered catalytic, industrial-scale ethynylations using acetylene with alkali metal and copper(I) acetylides:

These reactions are used to manufacture propargyl alcohol and butynediol. Alkali metal acetylides, which are often more effective for ketone additions, are used to produce 2-methyl-3-butyn-2-ol from acetylene and acetone.

See also
Alkylation
Methylation
Organolithium reagent
Organosodium chemistry

Alkyne coupling reactions
Glaser coupling
Cadiot–Chodkiewicz coupling
Castro–Stephens coupling
A3 coupling reaction

References

Carbon-carbon bond forming reactions
Organometallic chemistry
Addition reactions